The Livno cheese is a cheese first produced in the 19th century in the area of Livno, Bosnia and Herzegovina.

The Livno cheese is produced on the basis of French technology of making the Gruyère cheese. Originally, it was made from sheep's milk and nowadays it is mainly made from a mixture of sheep's and cow's milk. Its maturation period is between 60 and 66 days in a controlled environment. The flavor is robust, and in more aged cheeses the taste is slightly tangy. The largest producers are Mljekara Livno and Lura Dairy d.o.o. Livno, with a yearly production exceeding 500 metric tons.

Also see
List of Bosnia and Herzegovina cheeses

References

Bosnia and Herzegovina cheeses
Bosnia and Herzegovina cuisine
Cow's-milk cheeses
Cheese